Rusi Gochev (born 9 March 1958) is a Bulgarian retired football winger.

During his club career, Gochev played for Chernomorets Burgas, Levski Sofia and LASK Linz. He also amassed 33 caps for the Bulgaria national team, scoring 3 goals.

From July to August 2011, Gochev was director of youth academy at Chernomorets Burgas. He has also worked in a similar capacity with Levski Sofia.

Honours

Club 
Levski Sofia
 A PFG (3): 1978–79, 1983–84, 1984–85
 Bulgarian Cup (3): 1978–79, 1983–84, 1985–86

References

External links
 
 Profile at LevskiSofia.info

1958 births
Living people
Bulgarian footballers
Bulgaria international footballers
Association football wingers
FC Chernomorets Burgas players
PFC Levski Sofia players
LASK players
Bulgarian expatriates in Austria
First Professional Football League (Bulgaria) players